Mark Weston (born Mary Louise Edith Weston, 30 March 1905 – 29 January 1978), nicknamed "the Devonshire Wonder", was one of the best British field athletes of the 1920s. He was a  national champion in the women's javelin throw and discus throw in 1929 and won the women's shot put title in 1925, 1928 and 1929. At the 1926 Women's World Games he finished sixth in the two-handed shot put, where the final result was a sum of two best throws with the right hand and with the left hand.
Weston was born with atypical genitals due to a disorder of sex development (DSD), was assigned female at birth and raised as a girl. In April and May 1936, Weston underwent a series of corrective surgeries at the Charing Cross Hospital.

After surgery, Weston changed his first name to Mark, retired from competitions, and later worked as a masseur. In July 1936, Weston married Alberta Matilda Bray, and they had three children.

Following his example, his elder sibling Harry (previously known as Hilda) also changed his gender presentation and name in the 1930s. Harry died by suicide by hanging while suffering from depression in 1942.

Weston died in the Freedom Fields Hospital in Plymouth in 1978.

Gallery

References

1905 births
British female shot putters
British female discus throwers
British female javelin throwers
LGBT track and field athletes
Sex verification in sports
1978 deaths
Intersex sportspeople
Intersex men
English LGBT sportspeople
20th-century LGBT people